The Long Island Surf were a professional basketball team based in Long Island, New York. They played 14 seasons in the United States Basketball League (USBL).

History
The franchise was established in 1985 as the Long Island Knights, and played in the first USBL season, finishing with a 9–15 record. The team did not participate in the 1986 season but did return for the 1987 edition, ending the regular season as the 4th ranked team and qualifying for the Postseason Festival (the USBL playoffs), during which they reached the semifinals, where they lost to the Rhode Island Gulls. In the 1987 season, female player Nancy Lieberman played for the Long Island Knights. In the 1988 season the Knights ended at the bottom of the table with a 3–27 record. After the season, the franchise was disbanded.

In 1991, a group of 31 Long Island investors coordinated by Ed Krinsky re-established the team under the new name Long Island Surf and a starting budget of a 100,000 US$. In their first season back in the USBL, the Surf ended with a 7–13 record in the Northern Division. Forward Anthony Mason led the league in rebounds at 11.2 per game. In 1992 the Surf finished with the second best record of the division (13–13) and qualified for the Postseason Festival, where they lost to the Philadelphia Spirit in the division finals. In 1993 the divisions were abolished; the Surf ended 4th in the league table with a 14–10 record and qualified for the Postseason Playoffs, where they were eliminated by the Westchester Stallions. Point guard David Cain led the USBL in assists with 9.4 per game.

By 1994, the New York Times reported that the franchise had doubled its value. The team ended the 1994 season with a 13–14 record, progressing to the Postseason Festival quarterfinals where they were eliminated by the Connecticut Skylarks. Surf point guard Jean Prioleau led the league in assists with 10.3 a game. In 1995 the team improved its record to 14–12, but missed the playoffs (only the first three teams qualified); in 1996, ranking 3rd in the re-established Northern Division, the Surf reached the playoffs, where they lost to the Portland Mountain Cats. Former St. John's center Shawnelle Scott led the USBL in rebounding (13.5 per game) playing for the Surf. In 1997 the Surf had a successful season: they ranked 2nd in their division with a 19–7 record, and advanced to the USBL finals after defeating the Connecticut Skyhawks in the quarterfinals and the Atlanta Trojans in the semifinals. The Surf faced the Atlantic City Seagulls in the USBL finals, losing 112–114. In 1998, the Long Island franchise won the Northern Division with an 18–7 record, and again reached the USBL finals after beating the Columbus Cagerz in the second round, and the Connecticut Skyhawks in the Final Four; they lost the finals to the Atlantic City Seagulls for the second consecutive year, 96–100.

In 1999 the Surf finished second in the division behind the Connecticut Skyhawks, and reached the playoff semifinals, where they lost to the Skyhawks, 92–99. The franchise reached the playoffs again in 2000 after finishing 3rd in their division; they lost to the New Jersey ShoreCats, 103–116. The Long Island Surf played their final USBL season in 2001: in their last appearance they made the playoffs and advanced to the semifinals, where they lost to eventual champions Pennsylvania Valleydawgs. The team was then disbanded after the end of the season.

Season-by-season records

Source:

Notable players

 Mark Baker
 Michael Curry
 Lloyd Daniels
 Mark Davis
 Stewart Granger
 Adrian Griffin
 Juaquin Hawkins
 Geoff Huston
 Mike James
 George L. Johnson
 Shelton Jones
 Nancy Lieberman
 Anthony Mason
 Ron Moore
 Marcelo Nicola
 Jean Prioleau
 Michael Ray Richardson
 LaMont "ShowBoat" Robinson
 Jim Rowinski
 Shawnelle Scott
 Robert Werdann
 Rob Williams

Source

References

Defunct basketball teams in the United States
Defunct sports teams in New York (state)
Basketball teams in New York (state)
1985 establishments in New York (state)
1991 establishments in New York (state)
Sports in New York (state)
Basketball teams established in 1985
Basketball teams established in 1991
1988 disestablishments in New York (state)
2001 disestablishments in New York (state)
Sports clubs disestablished in 1988
Sports clubs disestablished in 2001
United States Basketball League teams